Bloody Hands Gap [el. ] is a mountain pass in Wayne County, Utah.

Bloody Hands Gap was named for a set of handprints painted in red on a rock wall.

References

Landforms of Wayne County, Utah
Mountain passes of Utah